Justice brothers (Ed, Gus and Zeke) were figures in motorsports and automotive industry. Founding a company in the oil additive industry.

Youth - Paola, Kansas
Edward Ray Justice, Sr. was born June 12, 1921, in Paola, Kansas.  Lawrence Milton "Zeke" Justice was born March 12, 1920, in Paola.  James Russell "Gus" Justice was born July 16, 1916, in Paola.

The Justice brothers were associated with cars and speed since the earliest years of their life. Growing up in Paola, Kansas, they started driving before they were teenagers. Their dad, Harry Milton Justice was an auctioneer in the Horse and Mule market. He would also auction farms and other large ticket possessions. Their mother, Anna Rule Justice was the more mechanically minded of their parents and where the boys were influenced with mechanics. They had three older sisters; Elma, Alberta and Marie. The first time the brothers did business together was when Ed and Zeke started a bike rental business at their home. The hung a sign on the tree in front of their house, "Justice brothers Bike Rentals". They had bought old bikes, some broken down and repaired and repainted them before putting them in their rental fleet.

Two of the three brothers were involved in serious auto accidents in their youth. Gus was thrown from his Chevrolet after hitting another car that had pulled into a farm road intersection illegally. He was permanently paralyzed from this accident. Gus had to leave college due to his injuries. Zeke was involved in an auto accident with a truck in which one of the occupants of the car was killed.

Gus bought a Cafe in Paola with the money that the townspeople had donated after his accident. Both Zeke and Ed worked at the Cafe for Gus. Ed would apply to and be accepted by Fry Aircraft School in Kansas City, Kansas. Zeke went to work at Western Auto in Kansas City.

Pre War, Early years - California
The lure of the car crazy culture of Southern California called and Ed Justice, Sr. responded by driving out on the famed Route 66 to his new home. The trip was paid for by his three passengers who paid $25 each and were allowed to bring anything that fit in a peck sack. Ed was able to convince his brother Zeke to leave his job at Western Auto in Kansas City by getting him a job with the legendary multi-millionaire Joel Thorne as part of his race shop fabrication crew. Thorne and his crew won the 1946 Indy 500 with George Robson as his driver. During his time there, Zeke met a young Frank Kurtis who had a rented space in the Thorne shop. Zeke would later become Frank's first employee when he formed Kurtis-Kraft after World War II. During his time at Thorne Engineering in Burbank, California, Zeke worked on a variety projects including the occasional side projects. Two interesting side projects were the modification of a car for a young Bill Pollack and the development of a three-wheel car under Frank Kurtis. Bill Pollack would later win the first grand prix at Pebble Beach in 1951. Bill also designed the road racecourse in Southern California known as Willow Springs. The three wheel car was sold to Gary Davis and became known as the Davis Motor Car Three Wheel, appearing on the cover of the August 1950 issue of Motor Trend magazine.

War years
Ed enlisted into the Army Air Corps during the beginning of World War II and served in the eighth airforce in Europe. Zeke suffered from Polio and was unable to serve in the military. He continued to work for Joel Thorne, whose shop was now making aircraft parts for the war effort. Gus Justice had been paralyzed in an automobile accident in Kansas at the age of 21 and was unable to serve in the military in World War II.

Post World War II years
After the war Ed joined Zeke at Kurtis-Kraft where they helped build many of the now legendary Kurtis-Kraft midget, Indy cars, and sports cars. During their time at Kurtis-Kraft, Ed and Zeke opened a separate shop in Glendale, California where they would do race car fabrication and repair. This was filling the need caused by the tremendous demand at the time and also Kurtis-Kraft's lack of time to address repairs due to the production of new cars. Kurtis-Kraft midgets were available in completed form or also in "kit" form. The Justice Brothers were hired by many to build "kit" cars for them, including Bill Vukovich, Loren Bennett, Jack Zimmermann and others. While at Kurtis-Kraft, Ed and Zeke installed the first Dzus fasteners on a race car while Frank was out of town on business. At first Frank was not happy with their change to his design, but later realize the benefit of using Dzus fasteners. The idea came from Ed's training as an aircraft mechanic. Ed had worked at Douglas Aircraft Flight Test in Santa Monica, California before the war and was an A&E. The first race car with Dzus fasteners was "Bullet" Joe Garson's Kurtis-Kraft midget sponsored by Bowes Seal Fast and owned by famed race car driver Rex Mays.

It was during their time at Kurtis-Kraft that Zeke met Chestein Wynn, a retired attorney who had received a formula from his son Clarence for an oil additive. The product grabbed Zeke's interest which caused him to share it with his brother Ed. They both were convinced that their future would be bright selling a product that no one had heard of on the opposite coast from where it was being made. Selling a midget that they built, they took the $2,500 profit and moved to Jacksonville, Florida. At the time they moved, Ed's wife was six months pregnant with their first child. Their distribution territory was Florida, Georgia and Cuba.

The Justice brothers later relocated back to California.

Famous employees and business associates
 Johnnie Parsons - 1950 Indy 500 winner
 Roger Ward - 2 time Indy 500 winner
 Duane Carter, Sr. - Indy and Champ Car driver
 Bob Bondurant - 1965 World Manufacturers Champion
 Benny Parsons - Daytona 500 winner & NASCAR Cup Champion

Notable sponsorships
 Johnnie Parsons/Frank Kurtis - 1950 Indianapolis 500 - Winner
 Jim Rathmann/Grantelli Brothers - 1952 Indianapolis 500 - 2nd Place
 Johnny Mantz - 1950 Southern 500 - Winner
 Don Garlits - Legendary Drag Racer - First Sponsor
 A. J. Foyt - 4 Time Indianapolis 500 - Winner
 Gary Beck/Larry Minor - 1983 NHRA Champions
 Lee Petty - Early NASCAR competitor - Daytona 500 winner
 Curtis Turner - NASCAR Legend
 Fireball Roberts - NASCAR Legend
 Richard Petty - NASCAR Legend - 7 time NASCAR Champion
 Rex White - NASCAR Legend - 1960 Grand National Champion
 Buck Baker - Early NASCAR competitor
 Connie Kalitta - Drag Racing Legend, Driver & Owner
 Don Prudhomme - Drag Racing Legend, Driver & Owner
 Jimmie Johnson - 7 time NASCAR Champion
 Alex Gurney - Formula Atlantic competitor

In media
 Rock and Roll star Sammy Hagar founded an early band called the Justice Brothers after seeing a Justice Brothers delivery van in the California beach area. He also worked at an auto parts store and had sold the products they originated.
 Products made by the Justice Brothers appeared in the movie GREASE
 Actor Christian Bale wore a Justice Brothers T-shirt in the movie The Machinist. This T-shirt celebrated the race car building time of the Justice Brothers life. Some fans of the film think it had an underlying message to the film. 
 Actor Matthew McConaughey wore a Justice Brothers designed drivers uniform in the movie EDtv.

Death
James “Gus” Justice died in 1983. Lawrence “Zeke” Justice died on August 9, 2001. Ed Justice, Sr.  died on August 30, 2008.

Awards and recognition
 Ed Justice - Founders Award - International Drag Racing Hall of Fame 
 The Justice brothers - 1999 Western Racing Association Honorees 
 The Justice brothers - Inducted into the Route 66 Hall of Fame 
 The Justice brothers - Inducted into the Dry Lakes Racing Hall of Fame 
 The Justice brothers - Inducted into the West Coast Stock Car Hall of Fame 
 The Justice brothers - Inducted into the Jacksonville Stock Car Racing Hall of Fame 
 The Justice brothers - Inducted into the National Midget Auto Racing Hall of Fame

References

External links
Company website
YouTube Video - The Justice Brothers Story
Ed Justice Jr website

American motorsport people
United States Army Air Forces soldiers
United States Army personnel of World War II
Oil companies of the United States
Companies based in Los Angeles County, California
Duarte, California
People from Paola, Kansas